An anesthetic technician is an allied healthcare worker who performs a patient care role predominantly assisting with the administration and monitoring of anesthesia and has an extensive knowledge of anesthesia techniques, instruments, supplies and technology.

Anesthetic technicians are mainly employed by anesthetic departments or operating theatre suites, but can be found in other areas of clinical practice including emergency departments, intensive care units (ICU) and day surgery clinics.

Role description 

Anesthetic technicians are involved with all aspects of the delivery of a patient's perioperative anesthetic care, taking into account the patients' religious and cultural beliefs and respecting their right to medical privacy and dignity at all times. Anesthetic Technicians’ also provide a key role in the emergency resuscitation of patients.

Prior to anesthesia 

Anesthetic technicians prepare equipment needed for the patient to safely undergo anesthesia. This involves:
 checking and setting up the anesthetic machine
 preparing intravenous drugs
 preparing intravenous therapy administration equipment
 preparing a range of devices to maintain the patient's airway (e.g. laryngeal masks, endotracheal tube)
 communicating with the patient when they arrive into the operating theatre
 establish peripheral intravenous access.
 applying anesthetic monitoring to help assess the patients' condition whilst under anesthesia.  This may include electrocardiography (ECG), blood pressure and oxygen saturation devices.  The monitoring of other parameters such as anesthesia depth monitors (EEG, bispectral index etc.) may also be necessary.

During anesthesia
The anesthetic technicians role includes assisting with:
 inducing and maintaining adequate anesthesia.
 establishing and securing an airway.
 making sure that patients are positioned in such a way NOT to cause discomfort or injury during their procedure.
 monitoring and maintaining patients' vital signs and anesthesia depth.
 temperature monitoring and regulation.
 collection and analysis of patient (blood) samples.
 acquiring and administering transfusion fluids and equipment.

After anesthesia
Anesthetic technicians assist the anesthetic with:
 waking the patient.
 removing airway devices.
 transferring patients to post-operative care units

Other activities
Regional variations exist, but anesthetic technicians may also be involved with:
 Airway establishment & management.
 Intra-operative intra-aortic balloon pump setup, operating and monitoring.
 Elective & Emergency Blood Management.
 Swan-Ganz pulmonary artery catheter insertion and monitoring.
 Intra-operative blood salvage setup, operating and monitoring.
 Drawing of blood Samples.
 Arterial blood gas analysis, including maintenance of analysers.
 Arterial line insertion and monitoring.
 Peripheral IV line insertion.
 Cardiopulmonary resuscitation.
 Central IV lines.
 TEG Sampling.
 Point of Care Analysis.

American Society of Anesthesia Technologists & Technicians 

American Society of Anesthesia Technologists & Technicians (ASATT), acknowledges the scope of practice for the Anesthesia technical personnel. The commitment of ASATT is to ensure that efficient, safe, competent, and ethical practices are provided to society and maintaining professional standards of practice. ASATT acknowledges that the Anesthesia technical personnel are a part of the Anesthesia care team as listed in the practice guidelines of the American Society of Anesthesiologists (ASA).  This position should not be confused with that of an anesthesiologist assistant who actively participates as a licensed anesthesia provider.

Certified Anesthesia Technician

Certified Anesthesia Technologist

Associate & Bachelors Programs 
 City College (Florida) 
 Grossmont College 
 Milwaukee Area Technical College 
  North Seattle Community College - Online 
 Renton Technical College 
 Sanford-Brown Institute - Houston 
 Sanford-Brown Institute - Iselin 
 Sanford-Brown Institute - Pittsburgh 
 Sanford-Brown College - St. Peters 
 Skyline College 
 Stony Brook University 
 Tarrant County College

See also
 Clinical officer anesthetists
 Physician assistant
 Anesthesiologist assistant
 Operating Department Practitioner

References 

Allied health professions
Anesthesia